Armand Boppart (7 April 1894 – 9 April 1975) was a Swiss water polo player. He competed in the men's tournament at the 1920 Summer Olympics.

References

External links
 

1894 births
1975 deaths
Swiss male water polo players
Olympic water polo players of Switzerland
Water polo players at the 1920 Summer Olympics
Place of birth missing